El Fondó de les Neus is a municipality in the comarca of Vinalopó Mitjà in the Comunidad Valenciana, Spain.

It is a small village, inland, west of the Alicante province. Its nearest city is Elche to the south east or Crevillente. The name literally means "Gorge of the Snow", a reference to the village's patron "The Virgin of the Snow". This effigy and the church is at the heart of village life.

References

http://www.fondoneus.es

Vinalopó Mitjà